Rugged Lark (May 1, 1981 – October 26, 2004) was Quarter Horse stallion who was a two-time American Quarter Horse Association (or AQHA) World Show Superhorse as well as being a three-time AQHA World Champion. He is also the winner of the Silver Spur Award

Life

Rugged Lark was the son of a Thoroughbred stallion Really Rugged and out of a Quarter Horse mare named Alisa Lark. Alisa Lark was a great-granddaughter of Leo and a great-great-granddaughter of both King P-234 and Joe Hancock P-455.

Show career 
Rugged Lark won the AQHA World Show Superhorse title in 1985 and in 1987. He also was an AQHA Superior Western Pleasure Horse, Superior Hunter Under Saddle Horse, and Superior Trail Horse. In 1987 he was the World Champion Senior Hunter Under Saddle Horse. In 1985 he was the World Champion Pleasure Driving Horse. He earned AQHA points in Hunter Under Saddle, Western Pleasure, Trail, Hunter Hack, Reining, Working Hunter, Western Riding, Pleasure Driving, and Barrel Racing.

Breeding record 
Among Rugged Lark's offspring are The Lark Ascending, Rugged Painted Lark, Look Whos Larkin – 1999 AQHA World Show Superhorse, Jolena Lark, Rugged Lark II and Forever a Lark.  He is one of only two stallions to sire other offspring to win superhorse titles.

Death and honors 
Rugged Lark was euthanized in October 2004 due to colic.

Rugged Lark was inducted into the AQHA Hall of Fame

Pedigree

See also
 List of historical horses

Notes

References

 All Breed Pedigree Database Pedigree of Rugged Lark retrieved on June 27, 2007
 American Quarter Horse Foundation – Rugged Lark accessed on September 2, 2017
 AQHA Hall of Fame accessed on September 2, 2017

External links
 Rugged Lark at Quarter Horse Directory
 Rugged Lark at Quarter Horse Legends

American Quarter Horse show horses
American Quarter Horse sires
1981 animal births
2004 animal deaths
AQHA Hall of Fame (horses)